Grover is an unincorporated community in Codington County, in the U.S. state of South Dakota.

History
Grover had its start in 1888 when the Great Northern Railway was extended to that point. A post office was established at Grover in 1888, and remained in operation until 1958.

References

Unincorporated communities in Codington County, South Dakota
Unincorporated communities in South Dakota